ARY Digital Network is a subsidiary of the ARY Group. The ARY group of companies is a Dubai-based holding company founded by a Pakistani businessman, Haji Abdul Razzak Yaqoob (ARY). The network has a video on demand streaming service called ARY ZAP.

History 
ARY Digital, formerly known as the Pakistani Channel, was launched in the United Kingdom in December 2000 to cater to the growing demands of South Asian entertainment in the region. Within a short span of three years, the unique proposition and the content of the channel resulted in massive popularity and in order to enable greater expansion and broadcast into other countries. It uses Samacom, a monopolising uplink provider based in the UAE, as the uplink teleport station.

Affiliate programming
Recently ARY Digital has affiliated with several other television networks to promote their content in Pakistan. Amongst these are Fashion TV for which a regional channel FTV Pakistan has been airing since December 2005 on the ARY Digital network. Plans are under way for Al Jazeera Urdu in affiliation with Al Jazeera targeting 110 million Urdu-speaking households worldwide and HBO Pakistan in association with HBO's south-Asian division. With the network's help, Nickelodeon is also planning to kick-start its operations in Nick Pakistan where it would be beamed into 2.5 million households with kids.

Specialized programming
By 2004, ARY Digital had ended up three sister ventures apart from the flagship channel ARY Digital, channels targeting generalized programming. They include: ARY News, a 24hr news channel;  ARY Musik, a channel aimed at the younger generation featuring the latest from the Pakistani music scene & ARY Qtv, a religious service. With these four channels under its belt, the network viewership grew by folds over the coming years and ARY Digital would often then call itself the premium entertainment provider in the region.

Channel list 
ARY Digital Network is composed of the following channels:
ARY Communications 
(Pvt.) Limited.

 ARY Digital HD - Entertainment Channel for Asia Region
A Sports
Pakistani sports channel. It was launched on 16 October 2021 and is a part of ARY Digital Network which earlier planned in 2016.On 9 October 2021, Wasim Akram, Waqar Younis, Wahab Riaz, Misbah ul Haq announced to join as its cricket analysts panel. In November 2022, Broadcast 2022 FIFA World Cup with Exclusive Pre & Post Match Analyst Show.

 ARY Zindagi - Infotainment Channel & Turkish drama Urdu dubbing
 ARY Musik - 24-hour Music
 ARY News - 24-hour independent news
 ARY Qtv - Quran TV, religious content
 Nickelodeon Pakistan children cartoon channel

international channel list global broadcasting

 ARY Digital UK - Infotainment for UK Region - No longer available
 ARY Family - Infotainment for UK Region
 New Vision TV - 24-hour independent news
 ARY Digital ME - Infotainment for Middle East Region
 ARY Digital USA - Infotainment for USA Region
 ARY Films - film distributing company
 ARY Tube - Official Video Portal of ARY Digital Network
A Sports

Over The Top (OTT)
 ARY ZAP
 ARY Vidly

Defunct channels
ARY Zauq
 The City Channel
 The Musik
 ARY One World
 ARY Shopping Channel
 VH1 Pakistan
 Fashion TV Pakistan
 HBO Pakistan
 QTV

ARY films

ARY Films is film distribution company running in Pakistan. It's a part of ARY Digital Network. Thirty five films including 11 Urdu, 6 Punjabi and 17 Pashto films were released by ARY Films in 2013. Among them Waar, Main Hoon Shahid Afridi, Josh, Chambaili, Zinda Bhaag, Siyaah and Lamha top the charts in industry.

BOL channel
Attempted take over of BOL Network and BOL News happened in August 2015 by ARY Digital Network CEO Salman Iqbal, who said that the decision was taken in view to provide career protection to media industry and its workers.[8] The founder of ARY Group said that his media group would launch the transmission of the channel within three weeks.[9] However this deal fell through and in September 2015 it was announced that ARY was not taking over BOL.[10]

Availability

Continental programming
In 2004, ARY Digital divided its broadcasts in such a way, that each Continent had different programming at different times, to better facilitate the audience.
The Channels were split as follows:
ARY Digital Asia
ARY Digital UAE
ARY Digital UK
ARY Digital USA

ARY Digital Asia
This version of the Channel is free-to-air, as channels in the Indian subcontinent are usually free-to-air . Unlike other versions of the Channel, ARY Digital Asia, features a wider variety of Local Programmes mostly dramas and international shows. Many of which may include foreign programmes including Hollywood, Bollywood and Lollywood movies, Indian, American & British TV shows, for example Criminal Minds, 24, Criminal Minds: Beyond Boundaries, NCIS and Prison Break

ARY Digital UK
ARY Digital UK is also free to air. The programming includes ARY Digital's  Dramas and TV shows while also having some programs for ARY Digital UK viewers only. The channel was called ARY Family from December 2017- November 2020 due to copyright issues.

ARY Digital UAE
ARY Digital UAE is also free to air, but the programming is limited to Pakistani programmes only, this includes ARY Digital's exclusive Dramas and TV shows, this is because UAE's local Channels own the rights for British, American and English shows and Hollywood films. 
Indian, American & British programmes are also not broadcast on the UAE version, because Indian networks are available in UAE.

ARY Media Advisory Board
At the turn of events leading to the emergency in December 2007, Salman Iqbal, CEO of the network announced along with the ARY Digital network committee the establishment of a media advisory board, the purpose of which would be to assess the media coverage (be it news or other programmes) on the network. Saying that ARY Digital has been reporting without bias for a while but the recent events ushering the emergency rule and temporary closure of one of the biggest news network Geo TV, ARY Digital required a better unbiased coverage. He concluded that an array of government leaders could weigh the coverage presented by the network on the basis of its rationality and coverage so that the media portrayed by the network was in verse with the way Pakistan is supposed to be imaged. The board would have seats for 20 members, each focusing on different aspects of media would provide their views on how media should be portrayed.

Criticism
For a brief period in 2003, ARY Digital received criticism upon its airing of a prisoner's derogatory comments against the Anti-Terrorism Court (ATC-3) and a video showing balded young girls behind bars begging for mercy. The contempt of court proceedings against the officials of the network were withdrawn after the judge accepted unconditional apologies.

Attempted take over of BOL Network and BOL News happened in August 2015 by ARY Digital Network CEO Salman Iqbal, who said that the decision was taken in view to provide career protection to media industry and its workers. The founder of ARY Group said that his media group would launch the transmission of the channel within three weeks. However this deal fell through and in September 2015 it was announced that ARY was not taking over BOL.

See also 
 ATN ARY Digital (Canada)
 ARY News
 ARY Films
 List of Pakistani television serials
 List of Pakistani television stations
 ARY Qtv
 List of programs broadcast by ARY Digital

References

External links 

 

ARY Digital
Companies based in Dubai
Companies based in Karachi
Mass media companies of the United Arab Emirates
Television networks in Pakistan
Television channels and stations established in 2000
Mass media in Sindh